E-flat minor is a minor scale based on E, consisting of the pitches E, F, G, A, B, C, and D. Its key signature consists of six flats. Its relative key is G-flat major and its parallel key is E-flat major. Its enharmonic equivalent, D-sharp minor, contains the same number of sharps.

The E-flat natural minor scale is:

Changes needed for the melodic and harmonic versions of the scale are written in with accidentals as necessary. The E-flat harmonic minor and melodic minor scales are:

Music in E-flat minor 

In the 24 canonic keys, most of the composers preferred E-flat minor, while Johann Sebastian Bach, Sergei Lyapunov, and Manuel Ponce preferred D-sharp minor.

In Book 1 of The Well-Tempered Clavier by Bach, Prelude No. 8 is written in E-flat minor while the following fugue is written in D-sharp minor. In Book 2, both movements are in D-sharp minor.

Haydn's Piano Trio No. 41, H. XV.31 in two movements, composed in 1794/95, one of the "London Trios", is in E-flat minor.

Beethoven applied E-flat minor to the slow introduction in the sixth (last) movement of his Septet Op. 20 by adding accidentals while bearing the key signature of E-flat major (three flats). The "Introduction" to his oratorio Christ on the Mount of Olives is also in this key, but with the full six-flat signature.

The final piece in Brahms' Klavierstücke, Op. 118, No. 6, is in E-flat minor. The piece, like many pieces in this key, is dark and funereal, being based on the Dies irae chant. Schubert ended his Impromptus No. 2, D. 899, in E-flat minor, the parallel key to its opening E-flat major, and so did Brahms in his Rhapsody No. 4, Op. 119. Chopin wrote his Etude No.6, Op. 10, his Polonaise No. 2, Op. 26, and his Prelude No. 14, Op. 28 in E-flat minor.

Tchaikovsky's 1812 Overture is a sonata form in E-flat minor framed by an extended introduction and a long coda, both in E-flat major.

Janáček's Piano Sonata, 1. X. 1905, arguably his best-known work for the piano, is in E-flat minor.

Alkan composed the final movement for Symphony for Solo Piano in E-flat minor.

Prokofiev's Symphony No. 6 opens in E-flat minor but does not return to this key. A few other less well-known composers also wrote symphonies in this key, such as Andrei Eshpai, Jānis Ivanovs (fourth symphony Sinfonia Atlantida, 1941), Ovchinnikov and Nikolai Myaskovsky. Aram Khachaturian wrote his Toccata in E-flat minor while studying under Myaskovsky.

E-flat minor is the key in which Shostakovich composed his fifteenth and final string quartet.

Rachmaninoff's Elegie, Op. 3, No. 1, from Cinq Morceaux de Fantaisie, is in E-flat minor, as is his Étude-Tableau, Op. 39, No. 5.

The waltz "On the Hills of Manchuria" by Ilya Shatrov, about the loss of Russia in the Russo-Japanese War, is written in E-flat minor. As mentioned, E-flat minor is common in Russian pieces. "On the Hills of Manchuria" is perhaps the most notable example.

Guitarist Yngwie Malmsteen has composed a number of pieces in E-flat minor, including the Concerto Suite for Electric Guitar and Orchestra.

The jazz composition "Take Five" is also in this key.

See also
 List of symphonies in E-flat minor

References
A. Morris, "Symphonies, Numbers And Keys" in Bob's Poetry Magazine, III.3, 2006.

External links

Musical keys
Minor scales